The Presidium of Parliament is the group of individuals elected by the Hellenic Parliament to deal with the business of organizing and running the Parliament. This is provided for by Article 65 of the Constitution of Greece.

Organization

The Presidium is:

The Speaker of Parliament 
Seven Deputy speakers
Three Deans
Six Secretaries

It is mandatory that the fourth Deputy Speaker, one dean and one secretary belong to the major opposition party, and that the fifth Deputy Speaker and one secretary belong to the second-in-power opposition party, and that the sixth Deputy Speaker belong to the third-in-power opposition party, and that the seventh Deputy Speaker belong to the fourth-in-power opposition party. A member of the Presidium, who of course must be a parliamentarian, cannot be a member of the Cabinet or an Under-Secretary.

Significance

The election of the Speaker of the Parliament is one of the most important moments in the operation of the Parliament, not only because the office of the Speaker of the Parliament is significant in itself, but also because the secret vote for the election of the Speaker constitutes the first opportunity for the assessment of the cohesiveness of the majority in Parliament. The Speaker is elected by the absolute majority of the total number of the MPs (i.e. by 151 votes). If this majority is not attained, the vote is repeated, and the candidate who gets the most votes is elected.

Role

The Speaker of the Parliament directs the business of the Parliament, represents the Parliament, is responsible for the enforcement of disciplinary measures against parliamentarians, and generally, is the head of all the services of the Parliament and possesses all the responsibilities bestowed on him or her by the Constitution, the Standing Orders, or stemming from the principle of independence of Parliament. In other words, the Speaker has the final say on all matters that concern the inner workings of Parliament. 

The Speaker is third in line in the Order of Precedence of the State, following the President of the Republic and the Prime Minister and preceding the leader of the Opposition.  Additionally, the Speaker stands in pro tempore for the President of the Republic when the latter is abroad for a prolonged period of time, passes away, resigns, is deposed, or is hindered from performing his or her duties for any reason whatsoever.

Other Members
The Deputy Speakers perform their duties as assigned to them by the Speaker or as provided in the Standing Orders. The Deans assist the Speaker in organizational and executive matters of the Parliament, while the Secretaries assist the Speaker in the Parliamentary sessions and are responsible for whatever else the Speaker assigns to them.

List of Office Holders since 1974

The current speaker is Kostas Tasoulas.

Hellenic Parliament
Presiding bodies of legislatures